The Macon and Birmingham Railway (M&B) was a railroad in the southeastern United States that operated from 1891 through 1922. The railroad was chartered on December 26, 1888, by the Macon Construction Company and completed in 1891 before the company went into receivership. In 1902 the line was acquired by the Georgia Southern and Florida Railway, which was affiliated with the Southern Railway. The railroad was abandoned by the GS&F between 1922 and 1923.

References

 
 Davidson, William. "Brooks of Honey and Butter: Plantations and people of Meriwether County, Georgia". Outlook Publishing Company, Alexander City, AL, 1971

Defunct Georgia (U.S. state) railroads
Railway companies established in 1891
Railway companies disestablished in 1923
American companies established in 1891
American companies disestablished in 1923
1923 disestablishments in Georgia (U.S. state)
1891 establishments in Georgia (U.S. state)
Predecessors of the Southern Railway (U.S.)